St Thomas' Hospital is a large NHS teaching hospital in Central London, England. It is one of the institutions that compose the King's Health Partners, an academic health science centre. Administratively part of the Guy's and St Thomas' NHS Foundation Trust, together with Guy's Hospital, King's College Hospital, University Hospital Lewisham, and Queen Elizabeth Hospital, it provides the location of the King's College London GKT School of Medical Education.

Originally located in Southwark, but based in Lambeth since 1871, the hospital has provided healthcare freely or under charitable auspices since the 12th century. It is one of London's most famous hospitals, associated with people such as Sir Astley Cooper, William Cheselden, Florence Nightingale, Alicia Lloyd Still, Linda Richards, Edmund Montgomery, Agnes Elizabeth Jones and Sir Harold Ridley. It is a prominent London landmark – largely due to its location on the opposite bank of the River Thames to the Houses of Parliament.

St Thomas' Hospital is accessible from Westminster tube station (a 10-minute walk across Westminster Bridge), Waterloo station (tube and national rail, also a 10-minute walk) and Lambeth North tube station (another 10-minute walk).

History

The Hospital at The Borough, Southwark

The hospital was described as ancient in 1215 and was named after St Thomas Becket – which suggests it may have been founded after 1173 when Becket was canonised. This date was when it was relocated from the precinct of St Mary Overie Priory to "Trenet Lane", then later to St Thomas Street. However, it is possible it was only renamed in 1173 and that there was an infirmary at the priory when it was founded at Southwark in 1106.

Originally the hospital was run by a mixed order of Augustinian canons regular and canonesses regular, dedicated to St Thomas Becket, and provided shelter and treatment for the poor, sick, and homeless. In the 15th century, Richard Whittington endowed a lying-in ward for unmarried mothers. The monastery was dissolved in 1539 during the Reformation and the hospital closed but reopened in 1551 and rededicated to Thomas the Apostle. This was due to the efforts of the City of London who obtained the grant of the site and a charter from Edward VI and the hospital has remained open ever since.

The hospital was also where one of the first printed English Bibles was produced in 1537, and this is commemorated by a plaque on the surviving wing in Borough High Street. The plaque inaccurately refers to "the first printed Bible in English" rather than "one of the first".

There were some twenty-four priors, masters, wardens or rectors who served between the foundation of the hospital and the Dissolution of the Monasteries in 1539.

Dr. Eleazar Hodson was the first St Thomas' physician about whom the medical historian Joseph Frank Payne was able to find any precise information. Hodson received his medical degree at Padua in 1612 and became F.R.C.P. in 1618. At the end of the 17th century, the hospital and church were largely rebuilt by Sir Robert Clayton, president of the hospital and a former Lord Mayor of London. Thomas Cartwright was the architect for the work. A statue of Clayton now stands at the north entrance to Ward Block of North Wing at St Thomas' Hospital and is Grade I listed. In 1721 Sir Thomas Guy, a governor of St Thomas', founded Guy's Hospital as a place to treat 'incurables' discharged from St Thomas'.

Some parts of the old St Thomas' Hospital survive on the north side of St Thomas Street, Southwark including the old St. Thomas' Church, now used mostly as offices but including the Old Operating Theatre, which is now a museum. However the hospital left Southwark in 1862, when its ancient site was compulsorily purchased to make way for the construction of the Charing Cross railway viaduct from London Bridge Station. The hospital was temporarily housed at Royal Surrey Gardens in Newington (Walworth) until new buildings on the present site in Lambeth near Lambeth Palace were completed in 1871.

The Victorian hospital in Lambeth

The present-day St Thomas' Hospital is located at a site historically known as Stangate in the London Borough of Lambeth.  It is directly across the River Thames from the Palace of Westminster on a plot of land largely reclaimed from the river during construction of the Albert Embankment in the late 1860s. The new buildings were designed by Henry Currey and the foundation stone was laid by Queen Victoria in 1868. There was a seventh pavilion at the north end of the site next to Westminster Bridge Road for the "Treasurer's House" (hospital offices). The hospital initially had 600 beds.

This was one of the first new hospitals to adopt the "pavilion principle" – popularised by Florence Nightingale in her Notes on Nursing – by having six separate ward buildings at right angles to the river frontage set 125 feet apart and linked by low corridors. The intention was primarily to improve ventilation and to separate and segregate patients with infectious diseases.

As the Palace of Westminster is still technically a royal palace, a convention has been adopted that any commoner who dies within the palace is officially recorded as having died at St Thomas' Hospital to remove the need to convene a jury of members of the Royal Household under the Coroner of the Queen's Household. The hospital was requisitioned by the War Office in 1914 to create the 5th London General Hospital, a facility for the Royal Army Medical Corps to treat military casualties.

Post-war rebuilding

The northern part of the hospital site was severely damaged during the Second World War, with three ward blocks destroyed. Limited reconstruction began in the 1950s including the building now known as East Wing. Complete rebuilding to a more ambitious plan to designs by Yorke Rosenberg Mardall was agreed on in the 1960s requiring the realignment of Lambeth Palace Road further away from the river to enlarge the hospital campus. The new buildings have white-tiled cladding, which was a characteristic of several other university and hospital buildings designed by that practice.

As construction of the thirteen storey block (now North Wing) was completed by John Laing & Sons in 1975 there was a widespread public reaction against the scale and appearance of this building – most notably from MPs who could see it from the river terrace of the Palace of Westminster. The southern part of the redevelopment, which would have included a second tall block, was never constructed. The three remaining Victorian ward pavilion blocks were refurbished in the 1980s. They are now Grade II listed buildings.

In November 1949, in an operating theatre in St Thomas' Hospital, Harold Ridley achieved the world's first implantation of an intraocular lens (IOL), treating a cataract in a 49-year-old female patient. In later life Ridley himself underwent successful bilateral intraocular lens implantation at St Thomas's. What was most pleasing to him was that he had the operation done in the same hospital where he had performed the first operation in 1949. Ridley was subsequently made a Knight Bachelor "for pioneering services to cataracts surgery".

With the closure of the Dreadnought Seamen's Hospital at the Greenwich Hospital in 1986, services for seamen and their families are provided by the Dreadnought Unit at St Thomas' Hospital. It allows eligible merchant seafarers access to priority medical treatment, except cardiac surgery, and is funded by central government with money separate from other NHS trust funds. It originally consisted of two 28-bed wards, but nowadays Dreadnought patients are treated according to clinical need and so are placed in the ward most suitable for their medical condition.

Following the merger of Guy's and St Thomas' Hospitals into one trust, accident and emergency services were consolidated at St Thomas' Hospital in 1993. Former prime minister Harold Wilson died at the hospital on 24 May 1995, as a result of cancer and Alzheimer's disease. In the late 1980s Dr Chris Aps introduced changes at St Thomas' Hospital which allowed cardiothoracic surgical patients to recover away from the intensive care unit in an overnight intensive recovery unit: this has become a template for similar units across the United Kingdom. In October 2005 children's departments moved to new facilities designed by Michael Hopkins at Evelina London Children's Hospital to the south-east of St Thomas' Hospital.

Response to COVID-19

As the situation in Wuhan deteriorated, at the end of January 2020, four hospital trusts in the UK, including St Thomas' and The Royal Free were put on standby to receive suspected patients.

After testing positive to COVID-19 on 27 March, Prime Minister Boris Johnson was admitted to St Thomas' on 5 April and as his condition deteriorated, he was moved to intensive care later that day. He was moved out of intensive care on 9 April and discharged 3 days later.

Facilities
The current main pedestrian entrance is in Westminster Bridge Road, although there is a separate vehicle and A&E entrance in Lambeth Palace Road; there is also a riverside pedestrian entrance, and the Lane Fox Unit (chronic respiratory problems) has its own riverside entrance, mainly for the use of patients on the Lane Fox Ward. The pedestrian entrance to the campus leads to a glazed link between the Lambeth Wing and the North Wing. Guy's and St Thomas' Charity commissioned sculptor Rick Kirby to produce a sculpture "Cross the Divide", and this was unveiled in 2000 outside the Main Entrance. To the north of the North Wing (closer to Westminster Bridge Road) there is a garden area above car parking with Naum Gabo's fountain sculpture Revolving Torsion at its centre.

Tommy's is a UK-based charity that funds research into pregnancy problems and provides information to parents. The charity believes that it is unacceptable that one in four women in the UK will lose a baby during pregnancy and birth. It started when two obstetricians working in the maternity unit at the hospital were inspired to start fundraising for more research into pregnancy problems. It funds three research centres in the UK, including St Thomas' in London, Saint Mary's Hospital, Manchester, and the recently established Royal Infirmary of Edinburgh.

Name
The use of the plural genitive s' in place of the singular genitive s's is fairly recent. The hospital newsletter in 2004 claimed that plural s' is grammatically correct, as "there are two men called St Thomas linked to the hospital's history: Thomas Becket and Thomas the Apostle". A hospital belonging to two men, both called Thomas, would be Thomases', so the name change in the late 20th century is considered by some to be a simple mistake.

Within the South Wing of the hospital there are a number of late Victorian brass plaques headed "St Thomas's Hospital" i.e. using singular genitive. However, the medical school used the singular genitive s's; the explanation given for this was that as the medical school of the hospital it was called "St Thomas's Hospital Medical School" (although following this logic it should perhaps have been called "St Thomas' Hospital's Medical School").

Medical training at St Thomas' Hospital
St Thomas's Hospital Medical School was established in 1550.  Following the establishment of Guy's Hospital as a separate institution, this continued as a single medical school, commonly known as The Borough Hospitals, with teaching across St Thomas' and Guy's Hospitals.  Following a dispute over the successor to the Surgeon Astley Cooper, Guy's established its own separate medical school in 1825 .

The medical school subsequently remerged in 1982 with that at Guy's to form the United Medical and Dental Schools of Guy's and St Thomas' Hospitals (UMDS). Subsequent additions included the Royal Dental Hospital of London School of Dental Surgery joining with Guy's Dental School on 1 August 1983 and St John's Institute of Dermatology on 1 August 1985. The latter had previously been located at 5 Lisle Street in Soho.

Following discussion held between 1990 and 1992 with King's College London and the King's College London Act 1997, the UMDS merged in 1998 with King's College School of Medicine and Dentistry to form as The Guy's, Kings & Thomas' Schools of Medicine (GKT School of Medicine), of Dentistry and of Biomedical Sciences. This was renamed as King's College London School of Medicine and Dentistry at Guy's, King's and St Thomas' Hospitals in 2005.

Nurse training at St.Thomas' Hospital 
The Nightingale Training School and Home for Nurses opened at St Thomas' Hospital on 9 July 1860 under Matron Sarah Elizabeth Wardroper , endowed from the publicly donated Fund raised after the Crimean War to honour Florence Nightingale.    It is now called the Florence Nightingale Faculty of Nursing, Midwifery & Palliative Care, and is also part of King's College London.

Portrayal in fiction
In the 1975 crime film Brannigan, interior shots in an office set with a Thames river view constructed on an upper floor in the north-east corner of the (built but not yet commissioned) North Wing stood in for "Scotland Yard" in scenes between John Wayne (Chicago police detective Brannigan) and Richard Attenborough (Metropolitan Police Commander Swann).
Graham Swift's 1996 novel Last Orders features several scenes from the hospital where one of the main characters, Jack Dodds, dies from cancer.
The main building was used as the exterior shot of the fictional Royal Hope Hospital featured in the Doctor Who episode "Smith and Jones".
The hospital also featured in the 2002 film 28 Days Later in which the hospital was abandoned due to the nationwide outbreak of a deadly virus which causes its victims to go insane.
Popular novelist Lucilla Andrews trained as a nurse at St Thomas' during the Second World War, and her experiences there are recounted in her autobiography No Time for Romance as well as being the basis for a series of wartime romances set in a fictional hospital inspired by St Thomas'.

Gallery

See also 
 Healthcare in London
 List of hospitals in England
 King's Health Partners
 Francis Crick Institute
 Florence Nightingale Museum
 Lambeth Palace Road, to the rear of the hospital
 Sarah Elizabeth Wardroper Matron 1854 to 1887 and Superintendent of the Nightingale School of Nursing 1860-1887
 Lucy M. Hall (1843–1907), physician, writer; first woman ever received at its bedside clinics

References

Citations

Sources 

 Nightingale, Florence & Anon., Una and Her Paupers, Diggory Press. .

External links

Guy's & St Thomas' Foundation Trust 
Old Operating Theatre Museum
History of St. Thomas' annexe in Godalming Surrey
Excerpts from Sir Harold Ridley's biography by David J Apple with some history of the modern hospital
Dreadnought Unit information provided by the Seamen's Hospital Society's funded Seafarers' Benefits Advice Line
History of the Dreadnought Seamen's hospital
Survey of London entry (1951)

English medieval hospitals and almshouses
Health in the London Borough of Lambeth
History of the London Borough of Lambeth
GKT School of Medical Education
NHS hospitals in London
Christian hospitals
Nursing schools in the United Kingdom
Teaching hospitals in London
Hospitals established in the 12th century
Buildings and structures on the River Thames
12th-century establishments in England
Voluntary hospitals
Physicians of St Thomas' Hospital